Energon may refer to:

Transformers: Energon, an anime series named after a power source in the Transformers stories
Phospho-Energon, a medicinal concoction produced in Sweden